Browning-Ferris Industries v. Kelco Disposal, 492 U.S. 257 (1989), was a case in which the Supreme Court of the United States held that the Eighth Amendment's prohibition of unreasonable fines does not apply to punitive-damage awards in civil cases when the United States is not a party.

Prior history 
Browning-Ferris Industries (BFI) had been the dominant provider of roll-off trash collection services in the Burlington, Vermont market since it entered the roll-off market in 1976.  Joseph Kelley was a district manager for BFI until 1980, when he left to found his own company, Kelco Disposal.  By 1982, Kelco had garnered over 40% of the roll-off market; in that year, BFI began a campaign of predatory pricing, which continued for several months, with the intent of driving Kelco out of the business.  In 1985, BFI sold their Burlington operations to another company.

In 1984, Kelco filed suit in the United States District Court for the District of Vermont alleging that BFI had violated the Sherman Antitrust Act.  Kelco also claimed, as an alternative state-law cause of action, that BFI interfered with its contracts with its customers.  In the subsequent jury trial, BFI was found liable on both claims.  In a separate one-day trial on the damages, the jury settled on compensatory damages of $51,146, and punitive damages of $6 million.  The trial court then awarded Kelco treble damages and attorney's fees on the anti-trust claim, but awarded $6,066,082.74 on the alternative state tort claim, so further action proceeded on the basis of the higher award.

BFI appealed the judgment to the Second Circuit Court of Appeals, and raised the issue of the excessive fines clause.  The Second Circuit affirmed the trial court's decision on both liability and damages, finding for the sake of argument that the jury's punitive-damage award was not excessive whether or not the Eighth Amendment applied to this case.  The Supreme Court granted certiorari to consider the specific question of whether the excessive fines clause applies to civil cases involving purely private parties.

See also
 List of United States Supreme Court cases, volume 492
 List of United States Supreme Court cases
 Lists of United States Supreme Court cases by volume
 List of United States Supreme Court cases by the Rehnquist Court

References

Further reading

External links
 

United States Supreme Court cases
United States Supreme Court cases of the Rehnquist Court
Excessive Fines Clause case law
1989 in United States case law